Malaise era is a term describing U.S.-market cars from roughly 1973 to 1983.  The U.S. federal government released several mandates to reduce pollution and improve the fuel efficiency and safety of cars in this era, which while successful, ultimately resulted in the death of the 1960s-style American muscle car, a marked drop in performance in most American vehicles, and a change in visual styling away from 1960s design cues to generally less popular stylings in the 1970s.

Origin of the term 
The term "malaise era", coined by journalist Murilee Martin, refers to U.S. President Jimmy Carter's malaise speech in which he discussed the 1979 oil crisis and a wider "crisis of confidence" within the United States.  Martin claimed the era began in 1973, when the U.S. government released new crash bumper regulations, and ended in 1983, when the Ford Mustang saw a significant performance increase after almost a decade of low performance.  The term has since entered wider use, being seen in numerous automotive blogs as well as works by professional organizations such as Car and Driver, Consumer Guide, Hagerty, Hemmings Motor News, Motor Trend, Popular Mechanics, Road & Track, and the New York Times.

Pre-malaise
Until this time the automotive industry in the United States had relied on powerful but inefficient carburetted engines to drive the typically large and heavy vehicles. Cars from just before the malaise era were often fast and powerful, with muscle cars in particular being extremely popular.

Government mandates

At the close of 1970, President Richard Nixon signed a series of amendments to the Clean Air Act into law.  The amendments established the National Ambient Air Quality Standards (NAAQS), New Source Performance Standards (NSPS); and National Emissions Standards for Hazardous Air Pollutants (NESHAPs), and overall significantly strengthened federal enforcement authority, all toward achieving aggressive air pollution reduction goals.  The amendments mandated a 90% reduction in hydrocarbons, carbon monoxide, and nitrogen oxides by 1975, relative to the 1970 standards, and instructed the Environmental Protection Agency—formally founded just that month—to implement these standards.

The technology did not exist to meet these requirements in a fashion that would also allow practical engines to continue making the same horsepower.  The simplest way for manufacturers to meet these highly ambitious emission cuts was to reduce power outputs in their vehicles: beginning in 1971, horsepower ratings for many American automobiles began to markedly drop.  It is important to note that some of these drops were merely on paper, caused by a concurrent shifting in the manner in which horsepower was measured (from gross to net, which resulted in lower values even when there were no changes made to a vehicle).  For example, the 350 cu in (5.7 L) L48 engine of a 1971 Chevrolet Corvette was rated at 270 (gross) horsepower, but the identical engine was rated at 200 (net) horsepower in 1972.  However, emission-based cuts resulted in notable real power losses starting in the 1971 model year.  These changes initially were due to a reduction in compression ratios to allow engines to run on lower octane unleaded gasoline rather than fuel using dangerous and polluting lead additives (a move taken initially by GM, but which all other major American automotive manufacturers adopted).  Many automotive manufacturers dropped horsepower ratings from their advertising, using cubic inch engine size instead.

More significant power reduction effects were caused by the adoption or increased use of emissions control procedures such as secondary air injectors (often called "smog pumps"), exhaust gas recirculation, retarded ignition, and thermal reactors.  For example, Pontiac’s 455 cu. in. V8 peaked at 310 net horsepower in 1973, but was down to 200 net hp in its last year of use, in 1976.  As such changes were legislative in nature rather than the result of voluntary developments by American car companies, as well as aggressive in scope and with a rapid deadline, the technologies used were hastily implemented and initially resulted in reliability issues, creating stalls and reducing fuel economy over and above power drops.

The new emission standards also spurred the deployment of the catalytic converter, added to almost all new vehicles from the 1975 model year onward, which in turn resulted in the increasing adoption of unleaded gasoline, as the converters could not function if leaded gasoline was used.

In addition to new environmental standards, new safety standards had a significant effect as well.  Starting in 1971, the National Highway Traffic Safety Administration (NHTSA) promulgated bumper regulations requiring specific bumper performance requirements in collisions at certain speeds and angles—which increased bumper size and weight beginning with the 1973 model year; these standards were further tightened for the 1974 model year.  The regulations specified bumper performance; they did not prescribe any particular bumper design.  Nevertheless, similar to how emissions standards were tackled, automotive manufacturers often at first took the simplest path, in this case equipping their cars with bulky, unsightly, protruding bumpers to be compliant.  This often meant additional vehicle length and greater weight.

Oil crises
The 1973 oil crisis caused a sudden and marked increase in the cost of oil and, by extension, gasoline. By the end of the crisis, in March 1974, the price of oil had nearly quadrupled, from U.S. $3 per barrel ($ in  dollars) to nearly $12 globally ($ in  dollars); U.S. prices were significantly higher. The result was a sudden switch in consumer taste from traditional domestic gas-guzzlers to more efficient compact cars.The shift towards smaller, more efficient vehicles benefitted foreign manufacturers, who produced more of such vehicles.  By 1975, 18.3% of U.S. sales were imported cars.  American brands had their slowest year since 1962, selling just 7,050,120 cars in 1975. By comparison, they sold 9.6 million cars in 1973.  The success of Japanese brands can be traced to the greater selection of compact cars and the development of technologies to improve fuel efficiency.  For example, Honda’s CVCC technology allowed its cars to pass emission standards without a catalytic converter.

Sales of larger domestic cars would rebound, but the 1979 oil crisis caused oil and gas prices to again increase significantly, doubling over 12 months, and there was a further shift in customer preference to smaller, more efficient vehicles.

The EPA began regulating for fuel efficiency in this period. The Corporate Average Fuel Economy (CAFE) standard was passed into law in 1975, requiring that the fuel economy of a manufacturer’s entire output of passenger car and light truck models be averaged into a miles-per-gallon fuel economy standard, which was then in turn used as the basis for further legislation. For example, in 1978 Congress mandated that manufacturers achieve a fleet average of 18 mpg by 1978, 19 mpg by 1979, and 20 mpg by 1980, rising to 27.5 mpg by 1985. Similarly, the Energy Tax Act levied fees on the sale of vehicles that failed to meet CAFE standards, as an attempt to discourage the sale of new inefficient vehicles.

Effects on brands 
The cumulative effect of these changes on the car lineups of American manufacturers was a series of redesigns and discontinuations of engine types and vehicle models and an overall lowering of performance.

The first-generation Mustang was cancelled after the 1973 model year, replaced with the well-selling but now oft-derided Mustang II, a platform which in its first year (1974) was over a foot shorter in length and some 800 pounds lighter but also peaked at 105 net horsepower compared to the previous years' (already emission-reduced) maximum of 266 net horsepower. Some cars were redesigned to fit in entirely different automotive categories: the Mercury Cougar and the Dodge Charger were transformed from muscle cars to personal luxury cars for the 1974 and 1975 model years, respectively—while the Chevrolet Nova became a luxury-oriented compact. The Chevrolet Chevelle continued to be built, but its SS performance option was ended after the 1973 model year, while the AMC Javelin, Dodge Challenger, Plymouth Barracuda, and Pontiac GTO were all cancelled entirely after the 1974 model year.

American automakers began introducing smaller, less powerful but more fuel efficient models to compete against foreign manufacturers, particularly the Japanese offerings.  Regardless, the sales of imports continued to climb.  In 1978, GM sold over 5 million cars, but by 1982 they sold about 3.5 million, a decrease of 34.2%.  Other American manufacturers saw similar losses; Ford sales fell 47% and Chrysler sales dropped 27% from 1978 to 1982.  In the same years, Toyota sales increased from 441,800 cars to 527,128 cars, a 19.3% increase.  Japanese brands Honda and Datsun saw increases of 33.1% and 39.1% respectively.  A year after the onset of the 1979 oil crisis, Japanese manufacturers surpassed Detroit's production totals, becoming first in the world.  Indeed, the share of Japanese cars in U.S. auto purchases rose from 9 percent in 1976 to 21 percent in 1980.

End
As a subjective label, there is no universally agreed upon date for when the malaise era ended. During the 1980s, the fuel crisis receded and vehicle performance began to increase again, and new technologies such as onboard computers, electronic fuel injection, the three-way catalytic converter and modern oxygen sensors began increasingly appearing in cars, enabling greater raw performance and less hobbling emission controls. The journalist who coined the term, Murilee Martin, argues the era ended in 1983, when the Mustang gained a 175 hp V8 engine (more power than it had had since 1973).

Views on era
The combination of the oil crises and government regulations has led numerous journalists to reflect on the reduced performance and perceived aesthetic deficiencies of cars offered to Americans in this era. One journalist described this period of automotive history as the "worst era in car design". Another journalist wrote that cars of this era were "bloated, underpowered, and uninspired".

Despite complaints against cars from this era and claims that they would never appreciate in value, select vehicles from the 1970s and 1980s started becoming more popular in the late 2010s. Their increase in popularity led to the creation of car shows dedicated only to cars from this era. According to the Hagerty Price Guide, these cars have recently seen the greatest increase in value when compared to other used cars: 82% of used cars saw no increase in price in 2018, but cars from the 1970s and 1980s increased in value by 24% and 38% respectively in the same year.

See also
 Corporate average fuel economy

References 

Automotive industry in the United States
Cars by period
Conservation and restoration of vehicles